Arturo Lanocita (4 June 1904 – 23 April 1983) was an Italian writer, journalist and film critic. He was member of the international film jury at the IX Mostra Internazionale d'Arte Cinematografica in Venice in 1948.

References

1904 births
1983 deaths
Italian film critics
Italian male journalists
20th-century Italian journalists
20th-century Italian male writers